Saint-Joseph-de-Madawaska is a settlement in New Brunswick.

History

Notable people

See also
List of communities in New Brunswick

References

Settlements in New Brunswick
Communities in Madawaska County, New Brunswick